Ayawaso North Municipal District is one of the twenty-nine districts in Greater Accra Region, Ghana. Originally it was formerly part of the then-larger Accra Metropolitan District in 1988, until a small portion of the district was split off to create Ayawaso North Municipal District on 15 March 2018; thus the remaining part has been retained as Accra Metropolitan District. The municipality is located in the central part of Greater Accra Region and has Accra Newtown as its capital town.

References 

 

Districts of Greater Accra Region